Cosmopterix xuthogastra is a moth of the family Cosmopterigidae. It is known from Kalimantan, a region of Borneo.

References

xuthogastra